Gavin Barnard Annandale (born 27 April 1989 in Welkom) is a South African rugby union player, currently playing with the . His regular position is lock.

Career

Youth

Annandale played high school rugby for Hoërskool Brandwag in Benoni, also captaining the side in 2007. He was also included in a few youth provincial tournaments; he played for the ' Under-16 side at the Grant Khomo Week in 2005 and for their Under-18 side at the 2006 Academy Week and 2007 Craven Week tournaments. He was also included in the  squads that participated in the 2006 and 2007 Under-19 Provincial Championship competitions.

In 2008, he moved to Bloemfontein to attend the Central University of Technology where he represented the  side in the 2008 Under-19 Provincial Championship.

Falcons

Griffons / CUT Ixias

However, he continued his rugby career in the Free State. He played for Welkom-based side the  during the 2010 Vodacom Cup competition, making three appearances. He also played for the  side in the Under-21 Provincial Championship in the latter half of the season. He was included in university side ' squad for the 2011 Varsity Shield competition, but failed to make any appearances, but (after appearing in a compulsory friendly match for the  against the ) made his Currie Cup debut later in 2011. He made a total of eleven appearances in the competition, starting six of those and helping the Griffons reach the semi-finals.

Annandale played in all nine of their matches during the competition and scored four tries. He then played in the remainder of the ' 2012 Vodacom Cup season, making three appearances, and played in a further nine matches during the 2012 Currie Cup First Division season.

Golden Lions

He made three appearances for them during 2013 Vodacom Cup, a competition they eventually won.

Leopards

He was included in the  squad for the 2013 Currie Cup Premier Division season, he was never included in a matchday squad.

Boland Cavaliers

He was on the move again in 2014 as he joined Wellington-based side  for the 2014 Currie Cup qualification tournament.

References

1989 births
Living people
Boland Cavaliers players
Falcons (rugby union) players
Golden Lions players
Griffons (rugby union) players
Leopards (rugby union) players
Rugby union flankers
Rugby union locks
Rugby union players from Welkom
South African rugby union players